Sinotitinae is one of three subfamilies of the Dimeroceratidae; a member of the Goniatitida, an extinctorder of ammonoid cephalopods from the Paleozoic.

The two comprised genera, Sinutites and Sunites have broad, crescent shaped whorl sections, but one, Sinutites has a dorsal siphuncle while in the other, Sunites the siphuncle is ventral.

References
 Sinotitinae entry on the Paleobiology Database 5/26/12

Dimeroceratidae
Late Devonian first appearances
Late Devonian animals
Late Devonian extinctions